Əlimədədli is a village and municipality in the Goygol Rayon of Azerbaijan.  It has a population of 321.

References 

Populated places in Goygol District